Tamaseu Leni Warren is the former Controller and Chief Auditor of Samoa. He served until September 2010.

References

Samoan politicians
Living people
Year of birth missing (living people)
Government audit officials
Place of birth missing (living people)